K62 or K-62 may refer to:

K-62 (Kansas highway), a state highway in Kansas
K62-class locomotive
LG K62, an Android smartphone
Delaware and Hudson K-62 Class, a steam locomotive